Congregation of Christian Retreat is the name of two Roman Catholic religious institutes, one of priests and one of nuns.

Communities

Priests 
 France: Les Fontenelles, Chusclan, Abundance
 Switzerland: Montbarry
 Belgium
 England
 Scotland
 Ireland

Sisters 
 France: Les Fontenelles
 Benin: Kandi, Banikoara

References

Catholic orders and societies